A darkroom is a room for processing light-sensitive photographic materials.

Darkroom, Dark Room, The Darkroom or The Dark Room may also refer to:

Literature 
 The Dark Room (play), a one-act play by Tennessee Williams
 The Dark Room (Narayan novel), a 1938 novel by R. K. Narayan
 The Dark Room (Walters novel), a 1995 novel by Minette Walters
 The Dark Room (Seiffert novel), a 2001 novel by Rachel Seiffert
 Dark Rooms (2009 novelette) Nebula-nominated novellette by Lisa Goldstein
 The Dark Room, a 1969 novel by Junnosuke Yoshiyuki
 Dark Room, a 1995 novel by Alison Tyler
 "The Dark Room" (poem), a poem by Enrique Lihn
 In the Darkroom, a 2016 book by Susan Faludi
 The Dark Room, a 2021 novel by Sam Blake

Music 
 Darkroom (band), a British electronic music project
 Dark Rooms, a band formed by American musician Daniel Hart
 Dark Rooms, 2013 album by Dark Rooms
 Dark Room (The Angels album), a 1980 album by The Angels
 Dark Room (Michele Morrone album), a 2020 album by Michele Morrone
 "Dark Rooms", 1981 song by DA! (band)
 "Dark Rooms", 2010 single by Italian Mafia DJ
 "Darkroom", 1980 song by Paul McCartney

Television 
 Darkroom (TV series), a 1980s American thriller series
 The Dark Room, a 1988 television play by Julian Gloag subsequently adapted into his novel Chambre d'ombre (1996)
 "Darkroom" (CSI: Miami), an episode of CSI: Miami
 "The Dark Room", an episode of Alcoa Presents: One Step Beyond

Film 
 The Dark Room (1982 film), an Australian film featuring Baz Luhrmann
 Darkroom (1988 film), directed by Terrence O'Hara and produced by Nico Mastorakis
 The Dark Room (1999 film), a TV film starring James Wilby based on the novel by Minette Walters
 The Dark Room (2007 film), a TV film featuring Sandrine Holt

Other uses 
 A Dark Room, a 2014 role-playing text-based game released on iOS
 The Dark Room, the fourth episode of the episodically-released video game Life Is Strange
 Dark room (sexuality), a darkened room, sometimes located in a nightclub, gay bathhouse or sex club, where sexual activity can take place

See also 

 
 
 Black room (disambiguation)
 Dark (disambiguation)
 Room (disambiguation)